Dallas Township is an inactive township in Webster County, in the U.S. state of Missouri.

Dallas Township was erected in 1855, taking its name from George M. Dallas, 11th Vice President of the United States.

References

Townships in Missouri
Townships in Webster County, Missouri